Bảo Đại (lit. "keeper of greatness", 22 October 191331 July 1997), born Nguyễn Phúc/Phước Vĩnh Thụy, was the 13th and final emperor of the Nguyễn dynasty, the last ruling dynasty of Vietnam. From 1926 to 1945, he was emperor of Annam and de jure monarch of Tonkin, which were then protectorates in French Indochina, covering the present-day central and northern Vietnam. Bảo Đại ascended the throne in 1932.

The Japanese ousted the Vichy French administration in March 1945 and then ruled through Bảo Đại, who renamed his country "Vietnam". He abdicated in August 1945 when Japan surrendered. From 1949 to 1955, Bảo Đại was the chief of state of the non-communist State of Vietnam. Viewed as a puppet ruler, Bảo Đại was criticized for being too closely associated with France and spending much of his time outside Vietnam. He was eventually ousted in a referendum in 1955 by Prime Minister Ngô Đình Diệm, who was supported by the United States.

Early life

Bảo Đại was born on 22 October 1913 and given the name of Prince Nguyễn Phúc Vĩnh Thụy in the Palace of Doan-Trang-Vien, part of the compound of the Purple Forbidden City in Huế, the capital of Vietnam. He was later given the name Nguyễn Vĩnh Thụy. His father was Emperor Khải Định of Annam. His mother was the emperor's second wife, Tu Cung, who was renamed 'Doan Huy' upon her marriage. She held various titles over the years that indicated her advancing rank as a favored consort until she eventually became Empress Dowager in 1933. Vietnam had been ruled from Huế by the Nguyễn dynasty since 1802. The French government, which took control of the region in the late 19th century, split Vietnam into three areas: the protectorates of Annam and Tonkin and the colony of Cochinchina. The Nguyễn dynasty was given nominal rule of Annam.

At the age of nine, Prince Nguyễn Phúc Vĩnh Thụy was sent to France to be educated at the Lycée Condorcet and, later, the Paris Institute of Political Studies. On 8 January 1926, he was made the emperor after his father's death and took the era name Bảo Đại ("Protector of Grandeur" or "Keeper of Greatness"). He did not yet ascend to the throne and returned to France to continue his studies.

Marriages
On 20 March 1934, age 20, at the imperial city of Huế, Bảo Đại married Marie-Thérèse Nguyễn Hữu Thị Lan (died 15 September 1963, Chabrignac, France), a commoner from a wealthy Vietnamese Catholic family. After the wedding, she was given the title Empress Nam Phương. The couple had five children: Crown Prince Bảo Long (4 January 1936 – 28 July 2007), Princess Phương Mai (1 August 1937 – 16 January 2021), Princess Phương Liên (born 3 November 1938), Princess Phương Dung (born 5 February 1942), and Prince Bảo Thắng (9 December 1943 – 15 March 2017). Although Bảo Đại later had additional children with other women, these are the only ones listed in the clan genealogy.

Mistresses

Nam Phương was granted the title of empress in 1945. By one count, Bảo Đại had relationships with eight women and fathered 13 children. Those named "Phương" are daughters, while those named "Bảo" are sons.

Independence and abdication 

In 1940, during the second World War, coinciding with their ally Nazi Germany's invasion of France, Imperial Japan took over French Indochina. While they did not eject the French colonial administration, the occupation authorities directed policy from behind the scenes in a parallel of Vichy France.
The Japanese promised not to interfere with the court at Huế, but in 1945, after ousting the French, coerced Bảo Đại into declaring Vietnamese independence from France as a member of Japan's "Greater East Asia Co-Prosperity Sphere"; the country then became the Empire of Vietnam. The Japanese had a Vietnamese pretender, Prince Cường Để, waiting to take power in case the new emperor's "elimination" was required. Japan surrendered to the Allies in August 1945, and the Viet Minh (under the leadership of communist Hồ Chí Minh) aimed to take power in a free Vietnam. Due to his popular political stand against the French and the 1945 famine, Hồ was able to persuade Bảo Đại to abdicate on 25 August 1945, handing power over to the Việt Minh – an event which greatly enhanced Hồ's legitimacy in the eyes of the Vietnamese people. Bảo Đại was appointed the "supreme advisor" to Hồ's Democratic Republic of Vietnam (DRV) in Hanoi, which proclaimed its independence on 2 September 1945. The DRV was then ousted by the newly formed French Fourth Republic in November 1946.

Cabinet

Return to power and Indochina War

Bảo Đại spent nearly a year as "supreme advisor" to the DRV, during which period Vietnam descended into armed conflict between rival Vietnamese factions and the French. He left this post in 1946 and moved to Hong Kong, where the French and Việt Minh both attempted unsuccessfully to solicit him for political support.

Eventually a coalition of Vietnamese anti-communists (including future South Vietnamese leader Ngô Đình Diệm and members of political/religious groups such as the Cao Dai, Hòa Hảo, and VNQDĐ) formed a National Union and declared to support Bảo Đại on the condition he would seek independence for Vietnam. This persuaded him to reject Việt Minh overtures and enter into negotiations with the French. On 7 December 1947, Bảo Đại signed the first of the Ha Long Bay Agreements with France. Despite ostensibly committing France to Vietnamese independence, it was considered minimally binding and transferred no actual authority to Vietnam. The agreement was promptly criticized by National Union members, including Diệm. In a possible attempt to escape the resulting political tension, Bảo Đại travelled to Europe and commenced on a four-month pleasure tour which earned him the sobriquet "night club emperor". After persistent efforts by the French, Bảo Đại was persuaded to return from Europe and sign a second Ha Long Bay Agreement on 5 June 1948. This contained similarly weak promises for Vietnamese independence and had as little success as the first agreement. Bảo Đại once again travelled to Europe whilst warfare in Vietnam continued to escalate.

After months of negotiations with French President Vincent Auriol, he finally signed the Élysée Accords on 9 March 1949, which led to the establishment of the State of Vietnam with Bảo Đại as Chief of State (國長, Quốc trưởng); the French also oversaw the creation of the Domain of the Crown where he was still officially considered to be the Emperor, this territory existed until 1955.

However, the country was still only partially autonomous, with France initially retaining effective control of the army and foreign relations. Bảo Đại himself stated in 1950: "What they call a Bảo Đại solution turned out to be just a French solution... the situation in Indochina is getting worse every day".

As Diệm and other hardcore nationalists were disappointed in the lack of autonomy and refused high government posts, Bảo Đại mainly filled his government with wealthy figures strongly connected to France. He then spent his own time in the resort towns of Da Lat, Nha Trang, and Buôn Ma Thuột, largely avoiding the process of governing. All this contributed to his reputation as a French puppet and a rise in popular support for the Việt Minh, whose armed insurgency against the French-backed regime was developing into a full-fledged civil war. Nonetheless, in 1950 he attended a series of conferences in Pau, France where he pressed the French for further independence. The French granted some minor concessions to the Vietnamese, which caused a mixed reaction on both sides.

In addition to the increasing unpopularity of the Bảo Đại government, the communist victory in China in 1949 also led to a further revival of the fortunes of the Việt Minh. When China and the Soviet Union recognized the DRV government, the United States reacted by extending diplomatic recognition to Bảo Đại's government in March 1950. This and the outbreak of the Korean War in June led to U.S. military aid and active support of the French war effort in Indochina, now seen as anti-communist rather than colonialist. Despite this, the war between the French colonial forces and the Việt Minh started to go badly for the French, culminating in a major victory for the Việt Minh at Điện Biên Phủ. This led to the negotiating of a 1954 peace deal between the French and the Việt Minh, known as the Geneva Accords, which partitioned Vietnam at the 17th parallel. The north side was given to the DRV, with the State of Vietnam receiving the south. Bảo Đại remained "Head of State" of South Vietnam, but moved to Paris and appointed Ngô Đình Diệm as his prime minister.

Second removal from power

At first, Ngô Đình Diệm exercised no influence over South Vietnam: the Việt Minh still had de facto control of somewhere between sixty and ninety percent of the countryside (by French estimates), whilst the rest was dominated by the various religious sects. Meanwhile, the new capital of Saigon was under the total control of criminal group Bình Xuyên. According to Colonel Lansdale, it had paid Bảo Đại a "staggering sum" for control of local prostitution and gambling and of Saigon's police force. 

Regardless, Diệm's forces embarked on a campaign against the Bình Xuyên, with fighting breaking out in the streets on 29 March 1955. In an attempt to protect his clients, Bảo Đại ordered Diệm to travel to France, but he was disobeyed and Diệm eventually succeeded in pushing his opponents out of the city. Using a divide and conquer strategy, Diệm then employed a mixture of force and bribery to sway the remaining religious sects to his side. 

Now with a broad range of support, a new Popular Revolutionary Committee (formed by Diệm's brother Ngô Đình Nhu) was able to call for a referendum to remove Bảo Đại and establish a republic with Diệm as president. The campaign leading up to the referendum was punctuated by personal attacks against the former emperor, whose supporters had no way to refute them since campaigning for Bảo Đại was forbidden. 

In any case, the 23 October referendum was widely condemned as being fraudulent, with the official results showing an implausible result of 98.9% in favor of a republic, while there was also evidence of widespread ballot box stuffing: the number of votes for a republic exceeded the total number of registered voters by 155,025 in Saigon, while the total number of votes exceeded the total number of registered voters by 449,084, and the number of votes for a republic exceeded the total number of registered voters by 386,067.

Bảo Đại was removed from power, with Diệm declaring himself president of the new Republic of Vietnam on 26 October 1955.

Life in exile

In 1957, during his visit to Alsace region, he met Christiane Bloch-Carcenac with whom he had an affair for several years. The relationship with Bloch-Carcenac resulted in the birth of his last child, Patrick-Édouard Bloch-Carcenac, who still lives in Alsace in France.

In 1972, Bảo Đại issued a public statement from exile, appealing to the Vietnamese people for national reconciliation, stating, "The time has come to put an end to the fratricidal war and to recover at last peace and accord". At times, Bảo Đại maintained residence in southern France, and in particular, in Monaco, where he sailed often on his private yacht, one of the largest in Monte Carlo harbor. He still reportedly held great influence among local political figures in the Quảng Trị and Thừa Thiên provinces of Huế. The Communist government of North Vietnam sent representatives to France hoping that Bảo Đại would become a member of a coalition government which might reunite Vietnam, in the hope of attracting his supporters in the regions wherein he still held influence. 

As a result of these meetings, Bảo Đại publicly spoke out against the presence of American troops in South Vietnam, and he criticized President Nguyễn Văn Thiệu's regime in South Vietnam. He called for all political factions to create a free, neutral, peace-loving government which would resolve the tense situation that had taken form in the country.
 
In 1982, Bảo Đại, his wife Monique, and other members of the former imperial family of Vietnam visited the United States. His agenda was to oversee and bless Buddhist and Caodaist religious ceremonies, in the California and Texas Vietnamese American communities.

Throughout Bảo Đại's life in both Vietnam and in France, he remained unpopular among the Vietnamese populace as he was considered a political puppet for the French colonialist regime, for lacking any form of political power, and for his cooperation with the French and for his pro-French ideals. The former emperor clarified, however, that his reign was always a constant battle and a balance between preserving the monarchy and the integrity of the nation versus fealty to the French authorities. Ultimately, power devolved away from his person and into ideological camps and in the face of Diem's underestimated influences on factions within the empire.

Bảo Đại died in a military hospital in Paris, France, on 30 July 1997. He was interred in the Cimetière de Passy.

Perception of Bảo Đại in Vietnam 

The Communist Party of Vietnam considered him to be a traitor. After he was once again helped by France as the head of state of Vietnam, Ho Chi Minh said in an interview with Chinese media: "Vĩnh Thụy brought the French invading army back to Vietnam and killed more compatriots. Vĩnh Thụy is a true traitor. The French colonists conspired to restore slavery in Vietnam. Vĩnh Thụy is the confidant of the colonists. Although Vietnamese law is very tolerant to those who have lost their way, they will severely punish the traitorous orphans. The Vietnamese people are determined to defeat all colonial conspiracies and fight for true independence and reunification."

Pictures

In popular culture

Bảo Đại was portrayed by actor Huỳnh Anh Tuấn in the 2004 Vietnamese miniseries Ngọn nến Hoàng cung (A Candle in the Imperial Palace).
On 13 May 2017, a watch owned by Bảo Đại, a unique Rolex ref. 6062 triple calendar moonphase watch made for him while he was working in Geneva, became one of the most expensive watches ever sold, selling for a then record price of US$5,060,427 at a Phillips auction in Geneva.

Bảo Đại coins 

The last cash coin ever produced in the world bears the name of Bảo Đại in Chữ Hán. There are three types of this coin. Large cast piece with 10 văn inscription on the reverse, medium cast piece with no reverse inscription, and small struck piece. All were issued in 1933.

Quotes

 In 1945 when the Japanese colonel in charge of the Hue garrison told Bảo Đại that he had (in line with the orders of the Allied commander) taken measures ensuring the security of the Imperial Palace and those within it against a possible Việt Minh coup, Bảo Đại dismissed the protection declaring "We do not wish a foreign army to spill the blood of our people."
 He explained his abdication in 1945 saying "We would prefer to be a citizen of an independent country rather than Emperor of an enslaved one."
When, after World War II, France attempted to counter Hồ Chí Minh's popularity and gain the support of the U.S. by creating a puppet government with him, he said "What they call a Bảo Đại solution turns out to be just a French solution."
 In a rare public statement from France in 1972, Bảo Đại appealed to the people of Vietnam for national reconciliation, saying "The time has come to put an end to the fratricidal war and to recover at last peace and accord."

Honours

National honours 

 Sovereign and Grand Master of the Imperial Order of the Dragon of Annam.
 Sovereign and Grand Master of the Imperial Order of Merit of Annam (revived and expanded as the National Order of Vietnam on 10 June 1955).

Foreign honours 

 : Knight of the Most Illustrious Order of the Royal House of Chakri (Kingdom of Thailand, 1939).
 : Knight Grand Cross of the Order of the Legion of Honour (10 September 1932).
 : Knight Grand Cross of the Royal Order of Cambodia.
 : Knight Grand Cross of the Order of the Million Elephants and the White Parasol.
 : Knight Grand Cross of the Order of the Crown (1935).
 : Knight Grand Cross of the Sharifian Order of Al-Alaoui (Kingdom of Morocco).
 : Member First Class of the Royal Family Order of Johor [DKI] (21 March 1933).

Reign symbols

References

Further reading
 Anh, Nguyên Thê. "The Vietnamese Monarchy under French Colonial Rule 1884–1945." Modern Asian Studies 19.1 (1985): 147–162 online.
 Chapuis, Oscar. The Last Emperors of Vietnam: From Tu Duc to Bao Dai (Greenwood, 2000).
 Chapman, Jessica M. "Staging democracy: South Vietnam's 1955 referendum to depose Bao Dai." Diplomatic History 30.4 (2006): 671–703. online
 Hammer, Ellen J. "The Bao Dai Experiment." Pacific Affairs 23.1 (1950): 46–58. online
 Hess, Gary R. "The first American commitment in Indochina: The acceptance of the 'Bao Dai solution', 1950." Diplomatic History 2.4 (1978): 331–350. online
 
 Szalontai, Balázs. "The 'Sole Legal Government of Vietnam': The Bao Dai Factor and Soviet Attitudes toward Vietnam, 1947–1950." Journal of Cold War Studies (2018) 20#3 pp 3-56. online

Other languages
 Bảo Đại's memoirs have been published in French and in Vietnamese; the Vietnamese version appears considerably longer.

External links

Photos of Bảo Đại's summer palaces 

 Web citation
 Images

 

1913 births
1997 deaths
Dethroned monarchs
Monarchs who abdicated
People from Huế
Nguyen dynasty emperors
World War II political leaders
Vietnamese anti-communists
Vietnamese people of the Vietnam War
Sciences Po alumni
Converts to Roman Catholicism from Buddhism
Vietnamese Roman Catholics
Child monarchs from Asia
Vietnamese expatriates in France
Lycée Condorcet alumni
Vietnamese monarchs
Burials at Passy Cemetery
Grand Croix of the Légion d'honneur
Knights Grand Cross of the Royal Order of Cambodia
First Classes of the Royal Family Order of Johor
Grand Crosses of the Order of the Crown (Belgium)